|}

The Coral Distaff is a Listed flat horse race in Great Britain open to fillies aged three years only.
It is run at Sandown over a distance of 1 mile (1,609 metres), and it is scheduled to take place each year in July. It takes place at the same meeting as the Eclipse Stakes.

The race was first run in 2003 as the Distaff Stakes.

Winners

See also 
 Horse racing in Great Britain
 List of British flat horse races

Notes

References 

Racing Post:

Flat races in Great Britain
Sandown Park Racecourse
Flat horse races for three-year-old fillies
Recurring sporting events established in 2003
2003 establishments in England